Coleophora hololeucella is a moth of the family Coleophoridae. It is found in Algeria and Egypt.

The larvae feed on Atriplex parvifolia and Chenopodium species. They feed on the leaves and possibly also on the fruits of their host plant.

References

hololeucella
Moths described in 1952
Moths of Africa